André Hoffmann may refer to:

 André Hoffmann (businessman) (born 1958), Swiss businessman
 André Hoffmann (footballer) (born 1993), a German footballer
 André Hoffmann (politician) (born 1941), a Luxembourgian politician
 André Hoffmann (speed skater) (born 1961), a German speed skater